Vernon Charles "Pete" Taylor (November 26, 1927 – November 17, 2003) was a Major League Baseball pitcher who played for the St. Louis Browns in .

External links

1927 births
2003 deaths
Baltimore Orioles (IL) players
Baseball players from Maryland
Batavia Clippers players
Little Rock Travelers players
Major League Baseball pitchers
Minot Mallards players
Montgomery Rebels players
Navegantes del Magallanes players
American expatriate baseball players in Venezuela
Oklahoma City Indians players
People from Severn, Maryland
Poughkeepsie Giants players
San Antonio Missions players
St. Louis Browns players
Toronto Maple Leafs (International League) players
Wilkes-Barre Indians players